James Shaffer (February 14, 1910 – March 9, 2014) was an African American religious leader, and pastor who led the Church of Universal Triumph, Dominion of God, Inc. after the death of James F. Jones in 1971.

Beginnings 
James Shaffer was born February 14, 1910, in Money, Mississippi, as the youngest of 16 children born to Jeff and Elmira Shaffer.

Meeting and following Jones 
James Shaffer and his first wife, Wyoming Shaffer, moved to Detroit in 1943. Once they arrived they decided to attend a meeting of Triumph the Church and Kingdom of God in Christ to hear James F. Jones, known as Prophet Jones, speak.

Next Dominion Ruler succeeding Prophet Jones 
Shaffer became a leading minister in the Church of Universal Triumph, Dominion of God, Inc., eventually serving as leader of the Detroit Headquarters' church, Universal Thankful Center #1, and assistant to Jones. In time Jones,  ailing in health, asked Shaffer to "carry his torch". On Jones's death in 1971, Shaffer succeeded him as 'Dominion ruler'.

In 1995, at the age of 85, Shaffer married long time Universal Triumph member Maggie Boatmon. The new Mrs. Shaffer then became the new 1st Dominion Lady, in succession to the Catherine L. Jones, the late James Jones's mother, who had been 1st Lady from the founding of the Dominion until her death in 1951.

In 2010, Shaffer celebrated his 100th birthday.

The church reported on, "March 9, 2014 we lost our beloved leader Rev. Lord James Shaffer as he left the physical body to a higher spiritual plane. He is greatly missed by his family and the spiritual community that he was so long a part of. He made this transition after turning 104 years young on Feb. 13, 2014. "Well done my good and faithful servant" Matt. 25:21."

References

External links
 https://web.archive.org/web/20120402203627/http://utdog.org/utdoghistory.html
 https://www.youtube.com/watch?v=G1dXrVjkY2c 
 https://www.flickr.com/photos/patriciadrury/4307567283/                                      * https://www.youtube.com/watch?v=so4QF6aFrXM

|

African-American Christian clergy
American Christian clergy
Clergy from Detroit
1910 births
2014 deaths
American centenarians
People from Leflore County, Mississippi
African-American centenarians
Men centenarians
20th-century African-American people
21st-century African-American people